Forte de Santa Catarina das Mós (Vila de São Sebastião) is a fort in the Azores. It is located in Angra do Heroísmo, on the island of Terceira.

Fort Santa Catarina
Santa Catarina Mos